Heihe (Russian: Хэйхэ) is a prefecture-level city of northern Heilongjiang province, China, located on the Russian border, on the south bank of the Amur (Heilong) River, across the river from Blagoveshchensk. At the 2020 census, 1,286,401 people lived in the prefecture-level city of whom 223,832 lived in the built-up area (or metro) made of Aihui District.

Heihe marks the northeast terminus of the diagonal Heihe–Tengchong Line, which is sometimes used to divide China into east and west.

History

Heihe, formerly Aihui or Aigun, is one of the five oldest cities in Heilongjiang, along with Tsitsihar, Yilan, Acheng and Hulan. Human beings started to settle in Heihe region as early as the Paleolithic Age. Later it became home to local tribes. During the Qing dynasty, Heihe was the first place troops sent to Heilongjiang were stationed. The predecessor of today's Heihe was the town established by the indigenous Ducher people of the Amur Valley in the mid-1650s. (The two last names both mean "the Black Dragon River" - the name for the Amur River in Chinese and Manchu, respectively).

After the Ducher were evacuated by the Qing to the Sungari or Hurka in the 1650s, the Ducher town was probably vacated. However, in 1683-85 the Manchus re-used the site as a base for their campaign against the Russian fort of Albazin. Aigun was the capital (the seat of the military governor) of Heilongjiang from 1683 to 1690, before the capital was moved to Nenjiang (Mergen). After the capture of Albazin in 1685 or 1686, the Qing governor relocated the town to a new site on the right (southwestern) bank of the Amur, about 3 miles downstream from the original. The new site occupied the location of the former village of the Daurian chief named Tolga. The city became known primarily under its Manchu name Saghalien Ula hoton (Manchu:  sahaliyan ula hoton) and Chinese name Heilongjiang Cheng, which both mean "Black River City". Later the governor office was transferred to Qiqihar. However, Aigun remained the seat of the Deputy Lieutenant-General (Fu dutong), responsible for a large district covering much of the Amur Valley within the province of Heilongjiang as it existed in those days. 

Aigun was visited around 1709 as a part of a nationwide Sino-French cartographic program by the Jesuits Jean-Baptiste Régis, Pierre Jartoux, and Xavier Ehrenbert Fridelli, who found it a stronghold, serving as the base of Manchus controlling the Amur River basin.
The Aigun Treaty was concluded at Aigun in 1858. According to this treaty,  the left bank of the Amur River was conceded to Czarist Russia.

After the Xinhai Revolution, Aigun became the county seat of the newly created Aigun County by the Republic of China.
On November 15, 1980, Heihe City was established, administering two county-level cities and three counties including Beian, Wudalianchi, Nenjiang, Sunwu and Sunke. Aihui County was abolished, being merged into the Heihe City.

Geography
Heihe is located at the South bank of the Amur, opposite to the city of Blagoveshchensk in Russia's Amur Oblast. Domestically, Heihe City borders Da Hinggan Ling Prefecture to the north, Yichun to the southeast, Suihua to the south, Qiqihar to the southwest, and Hulunbuir (Inner Mongolia) to the west. The Amur has formed the Sino-Russian border since the 1858 Aigun Treaty and 1860 Treaty of Peking. The area north of the Amur had previously belonged to Imperial China.

Climate
Heihe experiences a monsoon-influenced humid continental climate (Köppen climate classification Dwb), but Dwa in the south of the prefecture, with long, bitterly cold, windy, but dry winters due to the influence of the Siberian high, and warm, wet summers, due to the East Asian monsoon. Close to two-thirds of the annual precipitation falls in the months of June to August.

Administrative divisions

Transportation

The transportation to and from Heihe is as follows:

Highways
 China National Highway 202: Heihe–Dalian via Harbin, Jilin City and Shenyang
 Provincial highways: Heihe–Mohe, etc.
 Blagoveshchensk–Heihe Bridge, completed at the end of 2019, is a 2-lane highway bridge over the Amur to link Blagoveshchensk and Heihe.
Railway (China Railway): Heihe–Bei'an to Harbin, Qiqihar and Daqing
Air: Heihe Aihui Airport

The world's first international cable car to Blagoveshchensk has also been proposed to open in 2022.

Energy
West of Heihe, there is an HVDC back-to-back station for realizing an interconnection between the power grids of Russia and China with 750 MW transmission capacity.

Tourism

The Old City of Aigun is a famous historical scenic spot, in which the Treaty of Aigun between China and Russia was signed in the 19th century.

Sport
Heihe University has requested the Russian bandy club SKA Neftyanik to send a coach, offering a one-year contract.

Sister cities
  Blagoveshchensk, Amur Oblast, Russia
  Krasnoyarsk, Krasnoyarsk Krai, Russia
 Yakutsk, Sakha Republic, Russia

See also 
 Heihe–Tengchong Line

References

Cities in Heilongjiang
China–Russia border crossings
Prefecture-level divisions of Heilongjiang